Bryan Carbis (23 April 1961 in Falkirk, Scotland – 3 December 2008 in Davos, Switzerland) is a former ice speed skater from Great Britain, who represented the United Kingdom at the 1984 Winter Olympics in Sarajevo, Yugoslavia. There he finished in 39th (1500 m) and 41st (5000 m) place.

He was active in the speedskating section of the Swiss Skating Union (Schweizer Eislauf Verband), as a member of the International Skating Club in Davos (ISCD) and at the famous Eisstadion Davos icerink.

He died on 3 December 2008.

The name Carbis is of Cornish origin. Bryan was born in Scotland, but resided for the large part of his life in Davos, Switzerland.

References

External links
 
 SkateResults
 Swiss Skating Union committees
 site of the ISCD skating club

1961 births
Scottish male speed skaters
Speed skaters at the 1984 Winter Olympics
Olympic speed skaters of Great Britain
2008 deaths
Place of birth missing
British people of Cornish descent